Dejan Markovic (born 21 April 1975) is a retired Swiss football midfielder.

References

1970 births
Living people
Swiss men's footballers
FC Wettingen players
FC Aarau players
Yverdon-Sport FC players
FC Solothurn players
SC Young Fellows Juventus players
FC Wohlen players
FC Baden players
FC Wangen bei Olten players
Association football midfielders